Widowspeak is a compilation album by the singer Lydia Lunch, released in 1998 through New Millennium Communications (NMC).

Track listing

References

External links 
 

1998 compilation albums
Lydia Lunch albums